Mumtaz Begum may refer to:

 Mumtaz Begum (actress) (born 1923), Indian actress
 Mumtaz Begum (activist) (1923–1967), Bengali language activist 
 Mumtaz Begum Jehan Dehlavi (1933–1969), Indian film actress
 Mumtaz Begum (politician) (born 1956), former mayor of Bangalore
 Momtaz Begum, Bangladeshi folk singer
 Momtaz Begum-Hossain (born 1981), English journalist 
 Momtaz Begum (professor) (died 2020), Awami League politician